Amedroz Lake is a lake located on Vancouver Island south of Pipestem Inlet and west of Effingham Inlet.

References

Barkley Sound region
Lakes of Vancouver Island
Clayoquot Land District